Scott Hightower is an American poet, teacher, and reviewer. He is the author of five books of poetry. His third, Part of the Bargain, won the 2004 Hayden Carruth Award. He is a recipient of a Willis Barnstone Translation Prize for a translation from Spanish.

Early life and education
Hightower was born in Lampasas, Texas. He was the youngest child of a family that lived on a modest working ranch near the hamlet of Lometa, Texas.  Hightower had a sister and a brother. Billie Jewel Hightower (July 27, 1950 (Lampasas, Texas) - Oct. 15, 1992, West Palm Beach, Florida), his brother became a noted painter in Texas, the Chicago area, and Florida.

At the University of Texas, Hightower studied classical civilization, literature, and performance. He earned a master's degree in teaching. Eventually, he earning his Master of Fine Arts Degree from Columbia University where he won the Academy of American Poets Prize. At Columbia University, Hightower studied with J.D. McClatchy and William Matthews.

Career

Hightower’s four collections are sweeps of philosophical idylls, much in the tradition of Theocritus…a poet the author himself evokes from time to time. In the Anglo-Saxon tradition, the stance of the poet is that of an observant pilgrim traveling through the world. Beneath the hungers, urgencies, iniquities, and bereavements, there is a legacy—an inheritance beneath the artful ponderings of the found and the made. The poems range widely in style and subject:  soliloquies, laments, eccentric ponderings and contemplations of the physical and the sublime. Histories meld into considerations of the future.
 
In "Tin Can Tourist," Hightower’s first book, the poems move out from the plains of Texas to the streets of the Bronx; from the bedroom to the Spanish Steps of Rome and the Chora Church of Istanbul… and back.  The poems move through cultural highs and lows. Of the book, Marie Ponsot wrote, "The most exciting quality of Hightower’s work is its poetic and paradoxical unifying of emotional and intellectual depth with a marvelous quietness. Its lively incidents and anecdotes are grounded, rooted, in meditative awareness."
 
In "Natural Trouble," the theme of inheritance extends through changes of landscape and bad weather. The poet weaves through the guises of nature and the guises of art. There is a celebration of the physical world as a realm strewn with natural wonders and artifacts.  But with a Blakeian quality, there is a celebration of insight and darker realms of meaning.  There are shepherds, and swan eaters, and suicide bombers. There one also finds September 11, limits of the body, and tests that put "human charity on trial" ("Cusp and Tether"). Of this book, J.D. McClatchy wrote: "Scott Hightower has Marianne Moore’s scissors and Elizabeth Bishop’s spectacles and he has written a book in the spirit of their adventurous precisions."
 
Hightower’s third book, "Part of the Bargain," received the 2004 Copper Canyon Press Hayden Carruth Award. In it, Hightower explores the reconciliations that make one an individual, a part of a community, and as conscientious heir to a culture. Valences of biology, sexuality, nationality, literality, all swirl together and perform a balancing act. Operas and paintings of windows are the reflections of an "ineffable pageantry" of a multilayered life. Polio underwrites AIDS.  Sometimes there is the failure of love, harshness and "the failure of the human spirit." Sometimes love is successful in holding things together––not so much in a noble way as in an elemental way. The epigraph of the book is from Faust: "Behold how in the evening sunset-glow The green-encircled hamlets glitter." Sometimes things are cut apart.  Sometimes parts are held together.
 
"Self-evident" radicals, revolutionaries, and exiles find their way––through self-possession––out of the past and into Hightower’s poetry. Hightower departs from a notion that the practice of writing is at the elemental core of democracy. He reminds us that poetry by definition "seeks a foundation of the commonwealth in the truth of the individual, guaranteed and restored through the integrity of Language."

"Hontanares" was published by Devenir (el otro), Madrid, 2012. It is a bilingual collection of poems translated into Spanish by Natalia Carbajosa from Cartagena. "Hontanares" was launched in at El Círculo de Bellas Artes in Madrid, Nov. 13, 2012. Carbajosa (the translator), Juan Pastor (the publisher), and the celebrated novelist Antonio Muñoz Molina made presentations. This book extends Hightower's work on the Albornoz family, a family of statesmen, scientists, and poets, and of the Second Republic, deeply disrupted by the Spanish Civil War. This book bridges into Hightower's "Self-evident" with its themes of radical thought and exile.

Hightower's poetry reviews often appear in Fogged Clarity, The Brooklyn Rail, The Journal, Manhattan Review, Coldfront Magazine, and other national journals. He has taught writing at New York University (Gallatin School), Poets House, Fordham University, Drew University, the Gay Men's Health Crisis, and F.I.T. He lives in New York City with his life-partner Jose Fernandez and sojourns in Spain.

Books of poetry
 Tin Can Tourist (Fordham University Press, 2001)
 Natural Trouble (Fordham University Press, 2003)
 Part of the Bargain  (Copper Canyon Press, 2005)
 Self-evident  (Barrow Street Press, 2012)

As editor
 Women Rowing: An Anthology of Contemporary US Women Poets, translations by Natalia Carbajosa (Mantis Editores, Mexico, 2012)

References

External links
 Biography and photo
 Erik Piepenburg, "Behind the Poster: One Arm," NYTImes Art Beat, June 2, 2011

1952 births
Living people
People from Lampasas, Texas
American male poets
Fashion Institute of Technology faculty